Saipa may refer to:

Organizations
 SAIPA, an Iranian automobile manufacturer
 Saipa Diesel, an Iranian manufacturer of trucks and trailers
 South African Institute of Professional Accountants, a professional association

Sport
 Saipa F.C., an Iranian football team based in Karaj
 Saipa Shomal Sari F.C., an Iranian football team based in Q'aemshahr
 Saipa Cultural and Athletic Corporation, an Iranian multisport club based in Tehran and Karaj
 Saipa Tehran VC, an Iranian volleyball club formerly known as Saipa Alborz VC
 SaiPa, a Finnish ice hockey team